Edwin Vernon Morgan (February 22, 1865 – April 16, 1934) was an American diplomat.

He was born in Aurora, New York, the grandson of Congressman Edwin Barber Morgan.  He attended Phillips Academy and then in 1890 graduated from Harvard University in with a bachelor's degree.  Harvard awarded him a masters the following year.  He then taught at Harvard and Western Reserve University before entering the United States Foreign Service.

He served as United States Ambassador to Brazil, and served as Minister to Cuba, Paraguay, Uruguay, Portugal, and Korea.
 
An officer of the Order of the Southern Cross, he retired to Petropolis, Brazil, where he died on April 16, 1934.

References

External links
 

Harvard University alumni
19th-century American diplomats
Ambassadors of the United States to Korea
Ambassadors of the United States to Brazil
Ambassadors of the United States to Cuba
Ambassadors of the United States to Uruguay
Ambassadors of the United States to Paraguay
Ambassadors of the United States to Portugal
1865 births
1934 deaths
People from Aurora, Cayuga County, New York
Case Western Reserve University faculty
Phillips Academy alumni
United States Foreign Service personnel